Thubana dialeukos is a species of moth of the family Lecithoceridae. It is found in Yunnan in China and in Thailand.

External links
Review of the genus Thubana Walker (Lepidoptera, Lecithoceridae) from China, with description of one new species

Moths described in 2003
Thubana